Kabasaran is a traditional Minahasan martial art and war dance from North Sulawesi in Indonesia. It is performed by several men clad in red costumes, wielding a sword with a shield or a spear.

The  dance is performed exclusively by men of  lineage.

In general, the basic structure of the dance consists of nine movements using the sword or spear, also the stance moves which consists of two steps to the left, and two steps to the right. The dance is accompanied by percussion instruments such as gongs, drums, or kolintang called .

Gallery

See also

 Cakalele dance
 Indonesian martial arts
 Dance in Indonesia

Notes

External links
 Kabasaran dance North Sulawesi Government (in Indonesian)

Indonesian martial arts
Indonesian culture
Sport in Indonesia
Mixed martial arts styles
Sports originating in Indonesia
War dances
Minahasa people
North Sulawesi
Dances of Indonesia